Hungaroton is the oldest record and music publisher company in Hungary.

Previously called Qualiton, its name was changed to Hungaroton in the mid-1960s, though the Qualiton brand remained as a label for operetta and gypsy music releases. Also new popular music, rock and jazz labels (Pepita, Bravó, and Krém) were founded.

In the early 1990s the massive import of foreign records caused a serious decrease in Hungaroton's sales. Although the original company went into liquidation, new and smaller companies arose on the ruins of Hungaroton. The Hungaroton Gong and Hungaroton Classic companies went private in 1995, and were reunited in 1998 under the name Hungaroton Records Publisher Ltd. 

Nowadays it publishes approximately 150 new records per year, half of it classical and half of it popular music.

See also
 List of record labels

External links
  

Hungarian record labels
Hungarian brands
Record labels established in 1951
Classical music record labels
Pop record labels
Companies based in Budapest
1951 establishments in Hungary
State-owned record labels